Peter Walker (12 June 1942 – 8 July 2010) was an Australian rules footballer who played with Geelong in the Victorian Football League (VFL) during the 1960s.

Family

Football
A centre-half back who was originally from Beeac, Walker won the Carji Greeves Medal for Geelong's best and fairest player in 1965 and represented Victoria in nine interstate matches.

On 6 July 1963 he was a member of the Geelong team that were comprehensively and unexpectedly beaten by Fitzroy, 9.13 (67) to 3.13 (31) in the 1963 Miracle Match.

See also
 1963 Miracle Match

References

External links

1942 births
2010 deaths
Australian rules footballers from Victoria (Australia)
Geelong Football Club players
Geelong Football Club Premiership players
Carji Greeves Medal winners
One-time VFL/AFL Premiership players